The 1956 British Grand Prix was a Formula One motor race held on 14 July 1956 at Silverstone. It was race 6 of 8 in the 1956 World Championship of Drivers.

Classification

Qualifying

Race

Notes
 – 1 point for fastest lap

Shared drives
 Car #4: Alfonso de Portago (70 laps) and Peter Collins (30 laps). They shared the 6 points for second place.
 Car #3: Eugenio Castellotti (80 laps) and Alfonso de Portago (12 laps).

Championship standings after the race 
Drivers' Championship standings

Note: Only the top five positions are included.

References

British Grand Prix
British Grand Prix
British Grand Prix
British Grand Prix